Hillsboro is a town in Lawrence County, Alabama, and is included in the Decatur Metropolitan Area, as well as the Huntsville-Decatur Combined Statistical Area. It was incorporated in 1899. As of the 2010 census, the population of the town is 552, down from its record high of 608 in 2000. Along with North Courtland, it is one of two majority black communities in Lawrence County out of its six populated communities .

History

Hillsboro began in the late 1830s as a small community known as "Gilmersville," which was located east of the current town.  The name was inspired by a family of early settlers.  When the railroad was constructed through the area in the 1860s, the town shifted to its current location along the tracks.  The town developed throughout the latter half of the 19th century as an important refueling stop for trains and a local shipping center.  The town's name was eventually changed to "Hillsborough," and the current spelling was adopted in 1891.

Geography 
Hillsboro is located at  (34.638029, -87.188287). The town is concentrated along County Road 217 (Main Street) just south of the road's railroad crossing, a few miles west of Decatur, and a few miles south of Wheeler Lake.  The town's municipal boundaries extend northward to U.S. Route 72.

Demographics 

As of the census of 2000, there were 608 people, 221 households, and 169 families residing in the town. The racial makeup of the town was 14.64% White, 82.24% Black or African American, 1.81% Native American, 0.16% from other races, and 1.15% from two or more races. 0.99% of the population were Hispanic or Latino of any race.

There were 221 households, out of which 34.8% had children under the age of 18 living with them, 50.2% were married couples living together, 23.1% had a female householder with no husband present, and 23.1% were non-families. 21.7% of all households were made up of individuals, and 9.0% had someone living alone who was 65 years of age or older. The average household size was 2.75 and the average family size was 3.22.

In the town, the population was spread out, with 27.0% under the age of 18, 8.1% from 18 to 24, 31.7% from 25 to 44, 23.2% from 45 to 64, and 10.0% who were 65 years of age or older. The median age was 35 years. For every 100 females, there were 83.1 males. For every 100 females age 18 and over, there were 76.2 males.

The median income for a household in the town was $40,714, and the median income for a family was $52,000. Males had a median income of $26,979 versus $22,083 for females. The per capita income for the town was $14,457. About 3.9% of families and 7.4% of the population were below the poverty line, including 5.9% of those under age 18 and 22.9% of those age 65 or over.

2020 census

As of the 2020 United States census, there were 407 people, 215 households, and 143 families residing in the city.

Notable persons 
Rudolph M. Clay, former mayor of Gary, Indiana and member of the Indiana Senate
Joseph Wheeler, former Confederate Army and U.S. Army major general

References

External links

Towns in Alabama
Towns in Lawrence County, Alabama
Decatur metropolitan area, Alabama
Huntsville-Decatur, AL Combined Statistical Area